The theory of impetus was an auxiliary or secondary theory of Aristotelian dynamics, put forth initially to explain projectile motion against gravity. It was introduced by John Philoponus in the 6th century, and elaborated by Nur ad-Din al-Bitruji at the end of the 12th century. The theory was modified by Avicenna in the 11th century and Abu'l-Barakāt al-Baghdādī in the 12th century, before it was later established in Western scientific thought by Jean Buridan in the 14th century. It is the intellectual precursor to the concepts of inertia, momentum and acceleration in classical mechanics.

Aristotelian theory 

Aristotelian physics is the form of natural science described in the works of the Greek philosopher Aristotle (384–322 BC). In his work Physics, Aristotle intended to establish general principles of change that govern all natural bodies, both living and inanimate, celestial and terrestrial – including all motion, quantitative change, qualitative change, and substantial change.

Aristotle describes two kinds of motion: "violent" or "unnatural motion", such as that of a thrown stone, in the Physics (254b10), and "natural motion", such as of a falling object, in On the Heavens (300a20). In violent motion, as soon as the agent stops causing it, the motion stops also: in other words, the natural state of an object is to be at rest, since Aristotle does not address friction.

Philoponan theory

In the 6th century, John Philoponus partly accepted Aristotle's theory that "continuation of motion depends on continued action of a force," but modified it to include his idea that the hurled body acquires a motive power or inclination for forced movement from the agent producing the initial motion and that this power secures the continuation of such motion. However, he argued that this impressed virtue was temporary: that it was a self-expending inclination, and thus the violent motion produced comes to an end, changing back into natural motion.

Arabic theories

In the 11th century, Avicenna (Ibn Sīnā) discussed Philoponus' theory in The Book of Healing, in Physics IV.14 he says:

Ibn Sīnā agreed that an impetus is imparted to a projectile by the thrower, but unlike Philoponus, who believed that it was a temporary virtue that would decline even in a vacuum, he viewed it as persistent, requiring external forces such as air resistance to dissipate it. Ibn Sina made distinction between 'force' and 'inclination' (called "mayl"), and argued that an object gained mayl when the object is in opposition to its natural motion. Therefore, he concluded that continuation of motion is attributed to the inclination that is transferred to the object, and that object will be in motion until the mayl is spent. He also claimed that a projectile in a vacuum would not stop unless it is acted upon, which is consistent with Newton's concept of inertia. This idea (which dissented from the Aristotelian view) was later described as "impetus" by Jean Buridan, who may have been influenced by Ibn Sina.

In the 12th century, Hibat Allah Abu'l-Barakat al-Baghdaadi adopted Philoponus' theory of impetus. In his Kitab al-Mu'tabar, Abu'l-Barakat stated that the mover imparts a violent inclination (mayl qasri) on the moved and that this diminishes as the moving object distances itself from the mover. Like Philoponus, and unlike Ibn Sina, al-Baghdaadi believed that the mayl self-extinguishes itself.

He also proposed an explanation of the acceleration of falling bodies where "one mayl after another" is successively applied, because it is the falling body itself which provides the mayl, as opposed to shooting a bow, where only one violent mayl is applied. According to Shlomo Pines, al-Baghdaadi's theory was

the oldest negation of Aristotle's fundamental dynamic law [namely, that a constant force produces a uniform motion], [and is thus an] anticipation in a vague fashion of the fundamental law of classical mechanics [namely, that a force applied continuously produces acceleration].

Jean Buridan and Albert of Saxony later refer to Abu'l-Barakat in explaining that the acceleration of a falling body is a result of its increasing impetus.

Buridanist impetus
In the 14th century, Jean Buridan postulated the notion of motive force, which he named impetus.

 Buridan gives his theory a mathematical value: impetus = weight x velocity
Buridan's pupil Dominicus de Clavasio in his 1357 De Caelo, as follows:

"When something moves a stone by violence, in addition to imposing on it an actual force, it impresses in it a certain impetus. In the same way gravity not only gives motion itself to a moving body, but also gives it a motive power and an impetus, ...".

Buridan's position was that a moving object would only be arrested by the resistance of the air and the weight of the body which would oppose its impetus. Buridan also maintained that impetus was proportional to speed; thus, his initial idea of impetus was similar in many ways to the modern concept of momentum. Buridan saw his theory as only a modification to Aristotle's basic philosophy, maintaining many other peripatetic views, including the belief that there was still a fundamental difference between an object in motion and an object at rest. Buridan also maintained that impetus could be not only linear, but also circular in nature, causing objects (such as celestial bodies) to move in a circle.

Buridan pointed out that neither Aristotle's unmoved movers nor Plato's souls are in the Bible, so he applied impetus theory to the eternal rotation of the celestial spheres by extension of a terrestrial example of its application to rotary motion in the form of a rotating millwheel that continues rotating for a long time after the originally propelling hand is withdrawn, driven by the impetus impressed within it. He wrote on the celestial impetus of the spheres as follows:

"God, when He created the world, moved each of the celestial orbs as He pleased, and in moving them he impressed in them impetuses which moved them without his having to move them any more...And those impetuses which he impressed in the celestial bodies were not decreased or corrupted afterwards, because there was no inclination of the celestial bodies for other movements. Nor was there resistance which would be corruptive or repressive of that impetus." 

However, by discounting the possibility of any resistance either due to a contrary inclination to move in any opposite direction or due to any external resistance, he concluded their impetus was therefore not corrupted by any resistance. Buridan also discounted any inherent resistance to motion in the form of an inclination to rest within the spheres themselves, such as the inertia posited by Averroes and Aquinas. For otherwise that resistance would destroy their impetus, as the anti-Duhemian historian of science Annaliese Maier maintained the Parisian impetus dynamicists were forced to conclude because of their belief in an inherent inclinatio ad quietem or inertia in all bodies.

This raised the question of why the motive force of impetus does not therefore move the spheres with infinite speed. One impetus dynamics answer seemed to be that it was a secondary kind of motive force that produced uniform motion rather than infinite speed, rather than producing uniformly accelerated motion like the primary force did by producing constantly increasing amounts of impetus. However, in his Treatise on the heavens and the world in which the heavens are moved by inanimate inherent mechanical forces, Buridan's pupil Oresme offered an alternative Thomist inertial response to this problem. His response was to posit a resistance to motion inherent in the heavens (i.e. in the spheres), but which is only a resistance to acceleration beyond their natural speed, rather than to motion itself, and was thus a tendency to preserve their natural speed.

Buridan's thought was followed up by his pupil Albert of Saxony (1316–1390), by writers in Poland such as John Cantius, and the Oxford Calculators. Their work in turn was elaborated by Nicole Oresme who pioneered the practice of demonstrating laws of motion in the form of graphs.

The tunnel experiment and oscillatory motion

The Buridan impetus theory developed one of the most important thought experiments in the history of science, the 'tunnel-experiment'. This experiment incorporated oscillatory and pendulum motion into dynamical analysis and the science of motion for the first time. It also established one of the important principles of classical mechanics. The pendulum was crucially important to the development of mechanics in the 17th century. The tunnel experiment also gave rise to the more generally important axiomatic principle of Galilean, Huygenian and Leibnizian dynamics, namely that a body rises to the same height from which it has fallen, a principle of gravitational potential energy. As Galileo Galilei expressed this fundamental principle of his dynamics in his 1632 Dialogo:

This imaginary experiment predicted that a cannonball dropped down a tunnel going straight through the Earth's centre and out the other side would pass the centre and rise on the opposite surface to the same height from which it had first fallen, driven upwards by the gravitationally created impetus it had continually accumulated in falling to the centre. This impetus would require a violent motion correspondingly rising to the same height past the centre for the now opposing force of gravity to destroy it all in the same distance which it had previously required to create it. At this turning point the ball would then descend again and oscillate back and forth between the two opposing surfaces about the centre infinitely in principle. The tunnel experiment provided the first dynamical model of oscillatory motion, specifically in terms of A-B impetus dynamics.

This thought-experiment was then applied to the dynamical explanation of a real world oscillatory motion, namely that of the pendulum. The oscillating motion of the cannonball was compared to the motion of a pendulum bob by imagining it to be attached to the end of an immensely long cord suspended from the vault of the fixed stars centred on the Earth. The relatively short arc of its path through the distant Earth was practically a straight line along the tunnel. Real world pendula were then conceived of as just micro versions of this 'tunnel pendulum', but with far shorter cords and bobs oscillating above the Earth's surface in arcs corresponding to the tunnel as their oscillatory midpoint was dynamically assimilated to the tunnel's centre.

Through such 'lateral thinking', its lateral horizontal motion that was conceived of as a case of gravitational free-fall followed by violent motion in a recurring cycle, with the bob repeatedly travelling through and beyond the motion's vertically lowest but horizontally middle point that substituted for the Earth's centre in the tunnel pendulum. The lateral motions of the bob first towards and then away from the normal in the downswing and upswing become lateral downward and upward motions in relation to the horizontal rather than to the vertical.

The orthodox Aristotelians saw pendulum motion as a dynamical anomaly, as 'falling to rest with difficulty.' Thomas Kuhn wrote in his 1962 The Structure of Scientific Revolutions on the impetus theory's novel analysis it was not falling with any dynamical difficulty at all in principle, but was rather falling in repeated and potentially endless cycles of alternating downward gravitationally natural motion and upward gravitationally violent motion.  Galileo eventually appealed to pendulum motion to demonstrate that the speed of gravitational free-fall is the same for all unequal weights by virtue of dynamically modelling pendulum motion in this manner as a case of cyclically repeated gravitational free-fall along the horizontal in principle.

The tunnel experiment was a crucial experiment in favour of impetus dynamics against both orthodox Aristotelian dynamics without any auxiliary impetus theory and Aristotelian dynamics with its H-P variant. According to the latter two theories, the bob cannot possibly pass beyond the normal. In orthodox Aristotelian dynamics there is no force to carry the bob upwards beyond the centre in violent motion against its own gravity that carries it to the centre, where it stops. When conjoined with the Philoponus auxiliary theory, in the case where the cannonball is released from rest, there is no such force because either all the initial upward force of impetus originally impressed within it to hold it in static dynamical equilibrium has been exhausted, or if any remained it would act in the opposite direction and combine with gravity to prevent motion through and beyond the centre. The cannonball being positively hurled downwards could not possibly result in an oscillatory motion either. Although it could then possibly pass beyond the centre, it could never return to pass through it and rise back up again. It would be logically possible for it to pass beyond the centre if upon reaching the centre some of the constantly decaying downward impetus remained and still was sufficiently stronger than gravity to push it beyond the centre and upwards again, eventually becoming weaker than gravity. The ball would then be pulled back towards the centre by its gravity but could not then pass beyond the centre to rise up again, because it would have no force directed against gravity to overcome it. Any possibly remaining impetus would be directed 'downwards' towards the centre, in the same direction it was originally created.

Thus pendulum motion was dynamically impossible for both orthodox Aristotelian dynamics and also for H-P impetus dynamics on this 'tunnel model' analogical reasoning. It was predicted by the impetus theory's tunnel prediction because that theory posited that a continually accumulating downwards force of impetus directed towards the centre is acquired in natural motion, sufficient to then carry it upwards beyond the centre against gravity, and rather than only having an initially upwards force of impetus away from the centre as in the theory of natural motion. So the tunnel experiment constituted a crucial experiment between three alternative theories of natural motion.

Impetus dynamics was to be preferred if the Aristotelian science of motion was to incorporate a dynamical explanation of pendulum motion. It was also to be preferred more generally if it was to explain other oscillatory motions, such as the to and fro vibrations around the normal of musical strings in tension, such as those of a guitar. The analogy made with the gravitational tunnel experiment was that the tension in the string pulling it towards the normal played the role of gravity, and thus when plucked (i.e. pulled away from the normal) and then released, it was the equivalent of pulling the cannonball to the Earth's surface and then releasing it. Thus the musical string vibrated in a continual cycle of the alternating creation of impetus towards the normal and its destruction after passing through the normal until this process starts again with the creation of fresh 'downward' impetus once all the 'upward' impetus has been destroyed.

This positing of a dynamical family resemblance of the motions of pendula and vibrating strings with the paradigmatic tunnel-experiment, the origin of all oscillations in the history of dynamics, was one of the greatest imaginative developments of medieval Aristotelian dynamics in its increasing repertoire of dynamical models of different kinds of motion.

Shortly before Galileo's theory of impetus, Giambattista Benedetti modified the growing theory of impetus to involve linear motion alone:
... [Any] portion of corporeal matter which moves by itself when an impetus has been impressed on it by any external motive force has a natural tendency to move on a rectilinear, not a curved, path.

Benedetti cites the motion of a rock in a sling as an example of the inherent linear motion of objects, forced into circular motion.

See also
 Conatus
 Physics in the medieval Islamic world
 History of science

References and footnotes

Bibliography

Duhem, Pierre. [1906–13]: Etudes sur Leonard de Vinci
Duhem, Pierre, History of Physics, Section IX, XVI and XVII in The Catholic Encyclopedia

Natural philosophy
Classical mechanics
Obsolete theories in physics